Ada War Memorial Stadium is a football stadium located in Ada, Ohio. Also known simply as War Memorial Stadium, it was home to the Lima Warriors semi-professional football team from 2003–2006, and to the Ohio Northern University Polar Bears football team for 57 years before the opening of Dial-Roberson Stadium in 2004.  It is now home of Ada High School's football and track & field teams, and the home of the Lima Warriors semi-professional football team. In 2010, the stadium got a new Fair-Play scoreboard with a videoboard.

References

High school football venues in Ohio
Buildings and structures in Hardin County, Ohio
Ohio Northern University
Defunct college football venues
Ada, Ohio